Anthony Terras (born 21 June 1985) is a French shooter and Olympic athlete who won the bronze medal at the Men's skeet at the 2008 Beijing Olympics.

Records

References

External links
 
 
 

1985 births
Living people
French male sport shooters
Skeet shooters
Shooters at the 2004 Summer Olympics
Shooters at the 2008 Summer Olympics
Shooters at the 2012 Summer Olympics
Shooters at the 2016 Summer Olympics
Olympic shooters of France
Olympic bronze medalists for France
Sportspeople from Marseille
Olympic medalists in shooting
Medalists at the 2008 Summer Olympics
Shooters at the 2015 European Games
European Games bronze medalists for France
European Games medalists in shooting
Shooters at the 2019 European Games